Macrocheles craspedochetes is a species of mite in the family Macrochelidae.

References

craspedochetes
Articles created by Qbugbot
Animals described in 2003